Inhumanity may refer to:

 The opposite of humanity
 "Man's inhumanity to man", a phrase first documented in 1784

Music 
 Inhumanity (album), a 2003 album by Finnish band Mors Principium Est
 Monolith of Inhumanity, a 2012 studio album by American band Cattle Decapitation
 The Gospel of Inhumanity, a 1995 studio album by American band Blood Axis

Other uses
 "Inhumanity" (comics), a 2013–14 Marvel Comics crossover storyline

See also
 Dehumanization, the denial of full humanness in others and the cruelty and suffering that accompanies it
 Inhuman (disambiguation)